Buckhurst Hill County High School, BHCHS, (1938–1989) was a secondary school in Chigwell, Essex.

History
It opened on 15 September 1938. It was near to RAF Chigwell and the River Roding.

In 1953 there were 549 boys and the staff consisted of the headmaster and nineteen assistant masters.

Comprehensive
It became a comprehensive in the mid-1970s. The school was combined with two other schools in 1989 to become Roding Valley High School, located on a different site. The BHCHS building was subsequently sold off by Essex CC and is now the home of an independent faith school called Guru Gobind Singh Khalsa College.

Former Pupils' Association
The former pupils' association, Old Buckwellians, is still active with 1600 members.

Notable alumni

 David Braben, co-writer of the computer game Elite
 Prof Rodney Brazier, Professor of Constitutional Law since 1992 at the University of Manchester
 Prof Ronald Clements, Samuel Davidson Professor of Old Testament Studies from 1983 to 1992 of King's College London
 Nigel Cole, Film Director
 Joe Dever, author and games designer
 David Evennett, Conservative MP since 2005 for Bexleyheath and Crayford and from 1983 to 1997 for Erith and Crayford
 Mike Gapes, Labour MP since 1992 for Ilford South
 Peter Haining, writer
 Terrence Hardiman, actor
 Barry Hearn, sports impresario and former owner of Leyton Orient FC
 Rt Rev Graham Kings, Bishop of Sherborne since 2009
 Jason Merrells, actor
 Stan Newens, Labour MP from 1974 to 1983 for Harlow and from 1964 to 1970 for Epping
 Slipmatt, Matthew Nelson, electronic music producer and DJ
 Stephen Street, music producer
 Sir Patrick Vallance, physician and scientist

References

External links
 Old Buckwellians Website

Defunct schools in Essex
Boys' schools in Essex
Defunct grammar schools in England
Educational institutions established in 1938
Educational institutions disestablished in 1989
1938 establishments in England
1989 disestablishments in the United Kingdom
Buildings and structures in Chigwell